The 1908 United States House of Representatives elections were held for the most part on November 3, 1908, with Oregon, Maine, and Vermont holding theirs early in either June or September. They coincided with the 1908 United States presidential election, which William Howard Taft won. Elections were held for all 391 seats of the United States House of Representatives, representing 46 states, to serve in the 61st United States Congress.

Taft was not as popular as his predecessor, Theodore Roosevelt, but won with Roosevelt's backing, and his Republican Party lost only a handful of seats to the opposition Democrats. Without any striking national issues, the Republicans were able to remain in control. Regional issues led to some changes in House membership, but new Democrats who were elected by dissatisfied industrial workers were balanced out by new Republicans who gained seats in districts with a strong middle class presence.

Election summaries

Special elections 

There were nine special elections in 1908.

|-
! 
| George W. Smith
|  | Republican
| 1902
|  | Incumbent died November 30, 1907.New member elected February 15, 1908.Republican hold.
| nowrap | 

|-
! 
| Ariosto A. Wiley
|  | Democratic
| 1900
|  | Incumbent died June 17, 1908.New member elected November 3, 1908 to finish his brother's term.Democratic hold.
| nowrap | 

|-
! 
| Abraham L. Brick
|  | Republican
| 1898
|  | Incumbent died April 7, 1908.New member elected November 3, 1908.Democratic gain.Successor was also elected the same day to the next term, see below.
| nowrap | 

|-
! 
| Adolph Meyer
|  | Democratic
| 1890
|  | Incumbent died March 8, 1908.New member elected November 3, 1908.Democratic hold.Successor was also elected the same day to the next term, see below.
| nowrap | 

|-
! 
| Charles E. Littlefield
|  | Republican
| 1899 
|  | Incumbent died September 30, 1908.New member elected November 3, 1908.Republican hold.Successor had already been elected to the next term, see below.
| nowrap | 

|-
! 
| Llewellyn Powers
|  | Republican
| 18761878 1901 
|  | Incumbent died July 28, 1908.New member elected November 3, 1908.Republican hold.Successor had already been elected to the next term, see below.
| nowrap | 

|-
! 
| Charles T. Dunwell
|  | Republican
| 1902
|  | Incumbent died June 12, 1908.New member elected November 3, 1908.Republican hold.Successor was also elected the same day to the next term, see below.
| nowrap | 

|-
! 
| William H. Parker
|  | Republican
| 1906
|  | Incumbent died June 26, 1908.New member elected November 3, 1908.Republican hold.Successor was also elected the same day to the next term, see below.
| nowrap | 

|}

Regular election dates 
All the states held their regular elections November 3, 1908 except for three, which, held elections:

 June 1: Oregon
 September 1: Vermont
 September 14: Maine

Alabama

Alaska Territory 
See Non-voting delegates, below.

Arizona Territory 
See Non-voting delegates, below.

Arkansas

California

|-
! 
| William F. Englebright
|  | Republican
| 1906
| Incumbent re-elected.
| nowrap | 

|-
! 
| Duncan E. McKinlay
|  | Republican
| 1904
| Incumbent re-elected.
| nowrap | 

|-
! 
| Joseph R. Knowland
|  | Republican
| 1904
| Incumbent re-elected.
| nowrap | 

|-
! 
| Julius Kahn
|  | Republican
| 1898
| Incumbent re-elected.
| nowrap | 

|-
! 
| Everis A. Hayes
|  | Republican
| 1904
| Incumbent re-elected.
| nowrap | 

|-
! 
| James C. Needham
|  | Republican
| 1898
| Incumbent re-elected.
| nowrap | 

|-
! 
| James McLachlan
|  | Republican
| 1900
| Incumbent re-elected.
| nowrap | 

|-
! 
| Sylvester C. Smith
|  | Republican
| 1904
| Incumbent re-elected.
| nowrap | 

|}

Colorado

Connecticut

Delaware

Florida

|-
! 
| Stephen M. Sparkman
|  | Democratic
| 1894
| Incumbent re-elected.
| nowrap | 

|-
! 
| Frank Clark
|  | Democratic
| 1904
| Incumbent re-elected.
| nowrap | 

|-
! 
| William B. Lamar
|  | Democratic
| 1902
|  | Incumbent retired to run for U.S. senator.New member elected.Democratic hold
| nowrap | 

|}

Georgia

Idaho 

|-
! 
| Burton L. French
|  | Republican
| 1902
|  | Incumbent lost renomination.New member elected.Republican hold.
| nowrap | 

|}

Illinois

Indiana

Iowa

Kansas 

|-
! 
| Daniel R. Anthony Jr.
|  | Republican
| 1907 
| Incumbent re-elected.
| nowrap | 

|-
! 
| Charles F. Scott
|  | Republican
| 1900
| Incumbent re-elected.
| nowrap | 

|-
! 
| Philip P. Campbell
|  | Republican
| 1902
| Incumbent re-elected.
| nowrap | 

|-
! 
| James Monroe Miller
|  | Republican
| 1898
| Incumbent re-elected.
| nowrap | 

|-
! 
| William A. Calderhead
|  | Republican
| 18941896 1898
| Incumbent re-elected.
| nowrap | 

|-
! 
| William A. Reeder
|  | Republican
| 1898
| Incumbent re-elected.
| nowrap | 

|-
! 
| Edmond H. Madison
|  | Republican
| 1900
| Incumbent re-elected.
| nowrap | 

|-
! 
| Victor Murdock
|  | Republican
| 1902
| Incumbent re-elected.
| nowrap | 

|}

Kentucky

Louisiana

Maine

Maryland

|-
! 
| William H. Jackson
|  | Republican
| 1906
|  | Incumbent lost re-election. New member elected. Democratic gain.
| nowrap | 
|-
! 
| J. Frederick C. Talbott
|  | Democratic
| 1902
| Incumbent re-elected.
| nowrap | 
|-
! 
| Harry Benjamin Wolf
|  | Democratic
| 1906
|  | Incumbent lost re-election. New member elected. Republican gain.
| nowrap | 

|-
! 
| John Gill Jr.
|  | Democratic
| 1904
| Incumbent re-elected.
| nowrap | 

|-
! 
| Sydney Emanuel Mudd I
|  | Republican
| 1896
| Incumbent re-elected.
| nowrap | 
|-
! 
| George A. Pearre
|  | Republican
| 1898
| Incumbent re-elected.
| nowrap | 
|}

Massachusetts 

|-
! 
| George P. Lawrence
|  | Republican
| 1897 (special)
| Incumbent re-elected.
| nowrap | 

|-
! 
| Frederick H. Gillett
|  | Republican
| 1892
| Incumbent re-elected.
| nowrap | 

|-
! 
| Charles G. Washburn
|  | Republican
| 1906 (special)
| Incumbent re-elected.
| nowrap | 

|-
! 
| Charles Q. Tirrell
|  | Republican
| 1900
| Incumbent re-elected.
| nowrap | 

|-
! 
| Butler Ames
|  | Republican
| 1902
| Incumbent re-elected.
| nowrap | 

|-
! 
| Augustus Peabody Gardner
|  | Republican
| 1902 (special)
| Incumbent re-elected.
| nowrap | 

|-
! 
| Ernest W. Roberts
|  | Republican
| 1898
| Incumbent re-elected.
| nowrap | 

|-
! 
| Samuel W. McCall
|  | Republican
| 1892
| Incumbent re-elected.
| nowrap | 

|-
! 
| John A. Keliher
|  | Democratic
| 1902
| Incumbent re-elected.
| nowrap | 

|-
! 
| Joseph F. O'Connell
|  | Democratic
| 1906
| Incumbent re-elected.
| nowrap | 

|-
! 
| Andrew James Peters
|  | Democratic
| 1906
| Incumbent re-elected.
| nowrap |  

|-
! 
| John W. Weeks
|  | Republican
| 1904
| Incumbent re-elected.
| nowrap |

|-
! 
| William S. Greene
|  | Republican
| 1898 (special)
| Incumbent re-elected.
| nowrap | 

|-
! 
| William C. Lovering
|  | Republican
| 1896
| Incumbent re-elected.
| nowrap | 

|}

Michigan

Minnesota

Mississippi 

|-
! 
| Ezekiel S. Candler Jr.
|  | Democratic
| 1900
| Incumbent re-elected.
| nowrap | 

|-
! 
| Thomas Spight
|  | Democratic
| 1898 (special)
| Incumbent re-elected.
| nowrap | 

|-
! 
| Benjamin G. Humphreys II
|  | Democratic
| 1902
| Incumbent re-elected.
| nowrap | 

|-
! 
| Wilson S. Hill
|  | Democratic
| 1902
|  | Incumbent lost renomination.New member elected.Democratic hold.
| nowrap | 

|-
! 
| Adam M. Byrd
|  | Democratic
| 1902
| Incumbent re-elected.
| nowrap | 

|-
! 
| Eaton J. Bowers
|  | Democratic
| 1902
| Incumbent re-elected.
| nowrap | 

|-
! 
| Frank A. McLain
|  | Democratic
| 1898 (special)
|  | Incumbent retired.New member elected.Democratic hold.
|  nowrap | 

|-
! 
| John S. Williams
|  | Democratic
| 1892
|  | Incumbent retired to run for U.S. senator.New member elected.Democratic hold.
| nowrap | 

|}

Missouri

Montana 

|-
! 
| Charles N. Pray
|  | Republican
| 1906
| Incumbent re-elected.
| nowrap | 

|}

Nebraska 

|-
! 
| Ernest M. Pollard
|  | Republican
| 1905 (special)
|  | Incumbent lost re-election.New member elected.Democratic gain.
| nowrap | 

|-
! 
| Gilbert Hitchcock
|  | Democratic
| 1906
| Incumbent re-elected.
| nowrap | 

|-
! 
| John F. Boyd
|  | Republican
| 1906
|  | Incumbent lost re-election.New member elected.Democratic gain.
| nowrap | 

|-
! 
| Edmund H. Hinshaw
|  | Republican
| 1902
| Incumbent re-elected.
| nowrap | 

|-
! 
| George W. Norris
|  | Republican
| 1902
| Incumbent re-elected.
| nowrap | 

|-
! 
| Moses Kinkaid
|  | Republican
| 1902
| Incumbent re-elected.
| nowrap | 

|}

Nevada

New Hampshire

New Jersey

New Mexico Territory 
See Non-voting delegates, below.

New York

North Carolina

North Dakota 

|-
! rowspan=2 | 
| Thomas F. Marshall
|  | Republican
| nowrap | 1900
|  | Incumbent retired to run for U.S. senator.New member elected.Republican hold.
| nowrap rowspan=2 | 

|-
| Asle Gronna
|  | Republican
| nowrap | 1904
| Incumbent re-elected.

|}

Ohio

Oklahoma 

|-
! 
| Bird S. McGuire
| 
| 1907
| Incumbent re-elected.
| nowrap | 

|-
! 
| Elmer L. Fulton
| 
| 1907
|  | Incumbent lost re-election.New member elected.Republican gain.
| nowrap | 

|-
! 
| James S. Davenport
| 
| 1907
|  | Incumbent lost re-election.New member elected.Republican gain.
| nowrap | 

|-
! 
| Charles D. Carter
| 
| 1907
| Incumbent re-elected.
| nowrap | 

|-
! 
| Scott Ferris
| 
| 1907
| Incumbent re-elected.
| nowrap | 

|}

Oregon 

|-
! 
| Willis C. Hawley
|  | Republican
| 1906
| Incumbent re-elected.
| nowrap | 
|-
! 
| William R. Ellis
|  | Republican
| 1906
| Incumbent re-elected.
| nowrap | 
|}

Pennsylvania

Rhode Island

South Carolina

|-
! 
| George Swinton Legaré
|  | Democratic
| 1902
| Incumbent re-elected.
| nowrap | 

|-
! 
| James O'H. Patterson
|  | Democratic
| 1904
| Incumbent re-elected.
| nowrap | 

|-
! 
| Wyatt Aiken
|  | Democratic
| 1902
| Incumbent re-elected.
| nowrap | 

|-
! 
| Joseph T. Johnson
|  | Democratic
| 1900
| Incumbent re-elected.
| nowrap | 

|-
! 
| David E. Finley
|  | Democratic
| 1898
| Incumbent re-elected.
| nowrap | 

|-
! 
| J. Edwin Ellerbe
|  | Democratic
| 1904
| Incumbent re-elected.
| nowrap | 

|-
! 
| Asbury F. Lever
|  | Democratic
| 1901 
| Incumbent re-elected.
| nowrap | 

|}

South Dakota 

|-
! rowspan=2 | 
| Philo Hall
|  | Republican
| 1906
|  | Incumbent lost renomination.New member elected.Republican hold.
| rowspan=2 nowrap | 

|-
| colspan=3 | Vacant (incumbent died June 26, 1908)
|  | New member elected.Republican hold.

|}

Tennessee 

|-
! 
| Walter P. Brownlow
|  | Republican
| 1896
| Incumbent re-elected.
| nowrap | 

|-
! 
| Nathan W. Hale
|  | Republican
| 1904
|  |Incumbent lost re-election.New member elected.Republican hold.
| nowrap | 

|-
! 
| John A. Moon
|  | Democratic
| 1896
| Incumbent re-elected.
| nowrap | 

|-
! 
| Cordell Hull
|  | Democratic
| 1906
| Incumbent re-elected.
|  nowrap | 

|-
! 
| William C. Houston
|  | Democratic
| 1904
| Incumbent re-elected.
| nowrap | 

|-
! 
| John W. Gaines
|  | Democratic
| 1896
|  |Incumbent lost renomination.New member elected.Democratic hold.
| nowrap | 

|-
! 
| Lemuel P. Padgett
|  | Democratic
| 1900
| Incumbent re-elected.
| nowrap | 

|-
! 
| Thetus W. Sims
|  | Democratic
| 1896
| Incumbent re-elected.
| nowrap | 

|-
! 
| Finis J. Garrett
|  | Democratic
| 1904
| Incumbent re-elected.
| nowrap | 

|-
! 
| George Gordon
|  | Democratic
| 1906
| Incumbent re-elected.
| 

|}

Texas

Utah

Vermont

Virginia 

|-
! 
| 
| 
| 
| 
|
|-
! 
| 
| 
| 
| 
|
|-
! 
| 
| 
| 
| 
|
|-
! 
| 
| 
| 
| 
|
|-
! 
| 
| 
| 
| 
|
|-
! 
| Carter Glass
|  | Democratic
| 1902 
| Incumbent re-elected.
| 

|-
! 
| 
| 
| 
| 
|
|-
! 
| 
| 
| 
| 
|
|-
! 
| C. Bascom Slemp
|  | Republican
| 1907 
| Incumbent re-elected.
| 
|-
! 
| 
| 
| 
| 
|
|}

Non-voting delegates 

|-
! 
| Thomas Cale
|  | Independent
| 1906
|  | Incumbent retired.New delegate elected August 11, 1908.Democratic gain.
| nowrap | 

|-
! 

|-
! 
| William Henry Andrews
|  | Republican
| 1904
| Incumbent re-elected November 3, 1908.
| nowrap | 

|}

Washington

West Virginia 

|-
! 
| William P. Hubbard
|  | Republican
| 1906
| Incumbent re-elected.
| nowrap | 

|-
! 
| George C. Sturgiss
|  | Republican
| 1906
| Incumbent re-elected.
| nowrap | 

|-
! 
| Joseph H. Gaines
|  | Republican
| 1900
| Incumbent re-elected.
| nowrap | 

|-
! 
| Harry C. Woodyard
|  | Republican
| 1902
| Incumbent re-elected.
| nowrap | 

|-
! 
| James A. Hughes
|  | Republican
| 1900
| Incumbent re-elected.
| nowrap | 

|}

Wisconsin

Wyoming 

|-
! 
| Frank W. Mondell
|  | Republican
| 1898
| Incumbent re-elected.
| nowrap | 

|}

See also
 1908 United States elections
 1908 United States presidential election
 1908–09 United States Senate elections
 60th United States Congress
 61st United States Congress

Notes

References

Bibliography

External links
 Office of the Historian (Office of Art & Archives, Office of the Clerk, U.S. House of Representatives)